John W. Coleman (January 29, 1860 – January 27, 1915) was an American right-handed pitcher in Major League Baseball who played briefly for the Philadelphia Phillies during the 1890 season.

A native of Philadelphia, Pennsylvania, Coleman was a major leaguer whose career, statistically speaking, was only slightly different from that of Moonlight Graham. Coleman debuted on June 23, 1890, and was charged with eight runs (including four earned) on four hits with three walks and two strikeouts in  innings. He took the loss (21.60 earned run average) and never appeared in another major league game.

Coleman died at the age of 54 in Bristol, Pennsylvania.

External links
Baseball Reference
Retrosheet

1860 births
1915 deaths
19th-century baseball players
Major League Baseball pitchers
Philadelphia Phillies players
Baseball players from Philadelphia